Cudgewa is a small town in the Australian state of Victoria. Part of the Shire of Towong local government area, at the 2006 census Cudgewa and the surrounding district had a population of 237.

Burrowa-Pine Mountain National Park and Mount Mitta Mitta Regional Park are close to the town.

History
Cudgewa Post Office opened on 2 June 1879. A Cudgewa North Post Office was open for periods between 1906 and 1930.

The township was the last railway station on the Cudgewa railway line. The station was opened on Thursday, 5 May 1921 and closed on Sunday, 1 March 1981.

The town also had a tennis team.

Upper Murray Football League
The town has a football team involved with the Upper Murray Football League, an Australian Rules Football competition which began in 1893. Cudgewa Blues played its first season in 1893 and is one of three foundation clubs. Over the many years the club has produced many premiership winning teams most recently the back to back flags of 1999 and 2000. The club also uses the same jumpers as the Carlton FC.

References

Populated places on the Murray River
Towns in Victoria (Australia)
Shire of Towong